The 1940 Bolton by-election was held on 13 September 1940.  The by-election was held due to the death of the incumbent Conservative MP, John Haslam.  It was won by the Conservative candidate Edward Cadogan, who was unopposed due to the War-time electoral pact.

References

1940 elections in the United Kingdom
1940 in England
1940s in Lancashire
Elections in the Metropolitan Borough of Bolton
By-elections to the Parliament of the United Kingdom in Greater Manchester constituencies
By-elections to the Parliament of the United Kingdom in Lancashire constituencies
Unopposed by-elections to the Parliament of the United Kingdom (need citation)
September 1940 events